The following is a list of Lamar Cardinals basketball head coaches. There have been 12 head coaches of the Cardinals in their 72-season history.

Lamar's current head coach is Alvin Brooks. He was hired as the Cardinals' head coach in April 2021, replacing Tic Price, who was fired after the 2020–21 season.

References

Lamar

Lamar Cardinals basketball, coaches